Justice tourism or solidarity tourism is an ethic for travelling that holds as its central goals the creation of economic opportunities for the local community, positive cultural exchange between guest and host through one-on-one interaction, the protection of the environment, and political/historical education.  It also seeks to develop new approaches to and forms of globalization, and may overlap with revolutionary tourism. 

It has been promoted particularly in Bosnia and Palestine, especially by the Alternative Tourism Group and the Christian initiative in Palestine.

See also
Global justice movement
Flight shame
Socially responsible investing
Volunteer tourism

References

Activism
Types of tourism
Social justice
Ethical consumerism
Global ethics
Environmental sociology
Environmental psychology
Environmental justice
Human ecology
Environmental social science concepts
Social economy